Initiation is the third studio album by Canadian rock band Sumo Cyco, which was released on 7 May 2021. The single "Bystander" was released with the announcement of the album. "Bad News" was the last single released prior to the album. The single "Sun Eater" was released alongside the deluxe version of the album on October 8, 2021.

Track listing

References

2021 albums
Sumo Cyco albums